The King Michael I University of Life Sciences (abbreviated USVT), known until 2022 as the University of Agricultural Sciences and Veterinary Medicine of Banat, is a public university in Timișoara, Romania, which specializes in life sciences and veterinary medicine. It was named in honor of King Michael I of Romania.

History 
The existence of USVT is related to the establishment of the Faculty of Agronomy, within the Polytechnic Institute of Timișoara, by Law no. 617 promulgated by King Michael I on 30 July 1945. In 1948, the Faculty of Agronomy was transformed into an Agronomic Institute. In the same year, the Institute of Zootechnics and Veterinary Medicine was established in Arad, with two faculties: Zootechnics and Veterinary Medicine. In 1955, the Faculty of Zootechnics was transferred to the Agronomic Institute in Timișoara, and in 1957, the Faculty of Veterinary Medicine was integrated into a similar faculty in Bucharest. In 1957, the Faculty of Zootechnics was transformed into a section of the Faculty of Agronomy and functioned until 1962 under the name of the Faculty of Agriculture and Zootechnics. In 1962, the Faculty of Veterinary Medicine was established within Timișoara's Agronomic Institute. In 1968, by the Order of the Minister of Education no. 80646, the Faculty of Zootechnics was re-established, the Agronomic Institute functioning, until 1987, with three faculties: Agriculture, Zootechnics and Veterinary Medicine.

The overall degradation of the economic and social life, the crisis of the Romanian society and the restructuring of the university life by reduction in 1987 finds the Agronomic Institute with a single faculty with three sections (Agriculture, Zootechnics and Veterinary Medicine). In 1991, based on the Order of the Minister of Education no. 4894, the Agronomic Institute becomes the Banat University of Agricultural Sciences. In 1995, by Government Decision no. 568, the name of the university becomes the Banat University of Agricultural Sciences and Veterinary Medicine, and in 2013, by Government Decision no. 493, the institution is named after King Michael I of Romania, the symbolic founder of the university. The current name was approved by Government Decision no. 976 of August 2022.

Faculties

Campus 
The university campus is located at 119 Arad Way, at the exit to Arad. It was built between 1972–1982. All the faculties, the library, the dormitories, the canteen, the lands and a sports hall, as well as the biggest internship grounds – the didactic station – are in the same perimeter. 

The structure of the educational spaces totals 15,630 m2 of usable area and 25,370 m2 of developed area. Students have access to modernized spaces, amphitheaters, laboratories, classrooms and seminar rooms. USVT offers its students a number of 1,516 places in five student dormitories. The student canteen, with a number of 450 seats and an area of 1,589 m2, is considered one of the most modern and beautiful in the country. The internship of the university students takes place at the didactic station, Farm 1 – Cioreni, Farm 2 – Km 6 (former protocol base of the Romanian Communist Party), Farm 3 – Lugoj, Farm 9 – Green Forest, in the veterinary clinics, at the Young Naturalists Station, Romanian-German Center for Training and Professional Development in the Field of Agriculture, as well as profile companies.

In 2014, USVT received a certificate of excellence for "Best Campus" offered by Oxford University.

Doctores honoris causa 
 Karl Fritz Lauer (1938–2018), phytopathologist and herbologist
 Erwin Teufel (b. 1939), Minister-President of Baden-Württemberg (1991–2005)
 Hans-Peter Liebig (b. 1945), horticulturist
 Margareta of Romania (b. 1949), eldest daughter of King Michael I
  (b. 1951), phytopathologist and entomologist
  (b. 1951), Metropolitan of Banat (2014–present)
 Peter Hauk (b. 1960), Minister of Food, Rural Areas and Consumer Protection of Baden-Württemberg (2005–2010)
 Rüdiger Heining (b. 1968), economist and agricultural scientist

References 

Educational institutions established in 1991
Banat University of Agricultural Sciences and Veterinary Medicine
1991 establishments in Romania